Dalhart Independent School District is a school district based in Dalhart, Texas (USA).

DISD serves the city of Dalhart and unincorporated portions of Dallam County and Hartley County.

In 2009, the school district was rated "academically acceptable" by the Texas Education Agency.

Schools

Secondary schools

High schools
 Dalhart High School (Grades 9-12)

Junior high schools
 Dalhart Junior High School (Grades 6-8)

Primary schools
 Dalhart Intermediate School (Grades 3-5)
 Dalhart Elementary School (Grades PK-2)

New Schools
In a 2006 school bond election, Dalhart received the following changes to its schools
 The High school will move to a new school currently being built
 The Jr. High will move to the high school
 The Middle School will move to the Jr. High
 The Allyn Finch will become the district's headquarters
 The Elementary will receive improvements

References

External links
 Dalhart Independent School District

School districts in Dallam County, Texas
School districts in Hartley County, Texas